The Cars is the debut studio album by American rock band the Cars, released on June 6, 1978, by Elektra Records. Produced by Roy Thomas Baker, the album spawned the singles "Just What I Needed", "My Best Friend's Girl", and "Good Times Roll". It peaked at number 18 on the US Billboard 200 and has been certified six-times platinum by the Recording Industry Association of America (RIAA).

Background
Formed in Boston in 1976, the Cars consisted of Ric Ocasek, Benjamin Orr, Elliot Easton, David Robinson, and Greg Hawkes, all of whom had been in and out of multiple bands throughout the 1970s. After becoming a club staple, the band recorded a number of demos in early 1977. Some of these songs later appeared in finished form on The Cars, such as "Just What I Needed" and "My Best Friend's Girl", while others were saved for a later release, such as "Leave or Stay" and "Ta Ta Wayo Wayo" (both of which later saw release on their 1987 album Door to Door). The demos for "Just What I Needed" and "My Best Friend's Girl" were often played on Boston radio by DJ Maxanne Sartori, giving the band frequent airplay.

Both Arista and Elektra attempted to sign the band, but in the end, Elektra was chosen, due to its lack of new wave acts, allowing the band to stand out more than they would have had they signed with the new wave-heavy Arista. Robinson said of the choice, "Here they had the Eagles and Jackson Browne, and along comes this crazy Boston band who wanted a black-and-white photo collage on their cover."

Music and lyrics
Musically, The Cars has been described as new wave, power pop, and synth-rock. It featured a large amount of technology on many of its tracks, due to the band's appreciation for new equipment. Robinson said, "We'd always get the latest stuff from music stores even if it would be obsolete in two months. It reached the point where I'd have 10 or 12 foot switches to hit during a short set." The album also is notable for frontman Ocasek's use of irony and sarcasm. Keyboardist Hawkes said, "There was definitely a little self-conscious irony in there. We started out wanting to be electric and straight-ahead rock, and it kind of turned into an artier kind of thing."

Artwork
The cover model was Nataliya Medvedeva, a Russian-born model, singer, writer, and journalist.

Unlike many of the Cars' album covers, the cover for The Cars was designed by the record company, rather than drummer Robinson. Robinson said in an interview that he "had designed a very different album cover [for The Cars] that cost $80.00 to design." He continued, "I remember the price exactly. It was completely finished and everything, but it was a little more bizarre than the cover that they had in mind, so they changed some of it because of copyright problems and put it in as the inner sleeve. But I think that was way more how we envisioned who we were then." The cover was not well liked by the members of the band, however. Robinson said, "I thought that when the Elektra came out it was way too slick. The pictures of us I didn't like." Guitarist Elliot Easton expressed dislike for "that big grinning face", saying, "Man, I got tired of that cover."

Release
The Cars peaked at number 18 on the Billboard 200 in March 1979, spending 139 weeks on the chart. The record was also ranked number four on the Billboard 200 year-chart for 1979.

Three singles were released from the album: "Just What I Needed" (number 27 in the US, number 17 in the UK), "My Best Friend's Girl" (number 35 in the US, number three in the UK), and "Good Times Roll" (number 41 in the US), all of which enjoyed heavy airplay on AOR radio stations. Aside from the singles, album tracks "You're All I've Got Tonight", "Bye Bye Love", and "Moving in Stereo" all became radio favorites.

Critical reception

Critically, the album was well received. "The pop songs are wonderful", Rolling Stone critic Kit Rachlis stated in his 1978 review, adding: "Easy and eccentric at the same time, all are potential hits." He found that "the album comes apart only when it becomes arty and falls prey to producer Roy Thomas Baker's lacquered sound and the group's own penchant for electronic effects." Robert Christgau of The Village Voice wrote, "Ric Ocasek writes catchy, hardheaded-to-coldhearted songs eased by wryly rhapsodic touches, the playing is tight and tough, and it all sounds wonderful on the radio. But though on a cut-by-cut basis Roy Thomas Baker's production adds as much as it distracts, here's hoping the records get rawer."

In a retrospective review, AllMusic's Greg Prato praised The Cars as "a genuine rock masterpiece" and stated that "all nine tracks are new wave/rock classics", concluding: "With flawless performances, songwriting, and production, the Cars' debut remains one of rock's all-time classics." In 2000, it was voted number 384 in Colin Larkin's All Time Top 1000 Albums. Rolling Stone ranked The Cars at number 282 on its 2003 list of the "500 Greatest Albums of All Time", with the ranking slipping to number 284 in the 2012 update of the list, and to number 353 in the 2020 update.

Elliot Easton said of the album, "We used to joke that the first album should be called The Cars' Greatest Hits. We knew that a lot of great bands fall through the cracks. But we were getting enough feedback from people we respected to know that we were on the right track."

Track listing

Personnel
Credits adapted from the liner notes of The Cars.

The Cars
 Ric Ocasek – vocals, rhythm guitar
 Elliot Easton – lead guitar, backing vocals
 Benjamin Orr – vocals, bass
 David Robinson – drums, percussion, Syndrums, backing vocals
 Greg Hawkes – keyboards, percussion, saxophone, backing vocals

Technical
 Roy Thomas Baker – production
 Geoff Workman – engineering
 Nigel Walker – second engineer
 George Marino – mastering at Sterling Sound (New York City)

Artwork
 Ron Coro – art direction 
 Johnny Lee – design 
 Elliot Gilbert – photography

Charts

Weekly charts

Year-end charts

Certifications

References

1978 debut albums
Albums produced by Roy Thomas Baker
The Cars albums
Elektra Records albums